Horsing Kholar (born 27 March 1966) is a writer in Tiwa language and social worker of West Karbi Anglong District of Assam, India. He is a language secretary of Tiwa Mathonlai Tokhra (Tiwa Sahitya Sabha) central committee. He has interest in writing and collecting books. He knows Karbi, English and Assamese languages. Kholar was born on 27 March 1966, in Ulukunchi, West Karbi Anglong, Assam India. He is the eldest son of Sri Listor Kholar and Smt Sonbari Amsi.

Notable works 
He was awarded the Sahitya Academy Bhasha Samman for Tiwa language in 2019. Six books have been published by Tiwa Mathonlai Tokhra (TMT) or Tiwa Sahitya Sabha, one book is published himself and one book by Don Bosco Publication. So far he has written eight books:

 Tama Shupane Sunjuli (Tiwa musical instruments) 2004, published by TMT
 Plangsi (Poem) 2006, published by TMT
 Sigarune Sunjuli (Tiwa Hunting Instruments) 2006, published by TMT
 Sanggu (Marriage Rites & Ritual) 2012, self-published
 Adla re Thendone Sadra (Comedy Story) 2013, published by TMT
 Kharai Muthungraw (Basic information about birds) 2014, published by DBP (Don Bosco Publication)
 Chongmai (Riddles) 2016, published by TMT
 Panat Shala (Basic Moral Characters) 2021, published by TMT

He also helped in the compilation of dictionaries:

 Bilingual Dictionary (Tiwa–English) of Dr U. V. Jose, published in 2014 
 Trilingual Dictionary (Tiwa–Assamese–English) of ABILAC, North Guwahati, Assam, India (yet to be published)
 11-lingual Dictionary (Boro, Deori, Dimasa, Garo/Achik, Karbi, Missing, Rabha, Tiwa, Assamese, English and Hindi) of ITSSA (yet to be published)
 Text Book (RL) for classes II, III, IV of Don Bosco Higher Secondary School Umswai, (Jointly Mr. Fabian Malang) published in 2008.
A Dictionary of Atong: A Tibeto-Burman Language of Northeast India and Bangladesh by Seino Van Breugel, 2021

References 

Sahitya Akademi
1966 births
Living people
21st-century Indian male writers